Juan Carlos Hernandez Nava is a Mexican director, actor and producer of film and television.

Biography 

Juan Carlos Hernandez Nava was born in Toluca, Mexico. After he finished his high school in 1986, he initiated a professional career in the T.V. Production field creating his own production company called Herpiv Productions. This company was dedicated to making commercial spots, infomercials, corporate videos, and some other independent T.V. programs for T.V Mexiquence, a television station back in his city of origin.

In 1995 he immigrated to the United States to the city of San Antonio, Texas, then established the same production company with services to companies, institutions, non-profit corporations, and local T.V. stations.

In 1998 he became the International News Correspondent for Television Azteca Mexico, reporting every event of international interest to Mexico. In 2005, he released his first full-length feature film, The Reporter, under Herpiv Productions. In 2006, Juan Carlos Hernandez partnered with Tatiana Smithhart and began a fresh start with a new company called Eagle Eye Productions. The new company took off boldly and started producing T.V shows, documentaries, series, and a long feature movie at the end of 2008.

His constant development in the field of the production gave him wide experience and knowledge, both behind and in front of the camera.

Some of his productions include:

1998 produced and directed the Television Series Liberation on Channel 23 on San Antonio, Texas 1999 produced and directed the Television Series Jubilee Alive on Channel 23 on San Antonio, Texas. 2000 produced and directed the documentary The Manual 2001 produced and directed Television Series The Manual Channel 60 Telemundo in San Antonio, Texas. 2002 produced and directed documental A Blessed Nation 2004 Juan Carlos Hernandez was the pioneer of Azteca America helping to set up the station in San Antonio, Texas channel 31. 2005 produced and directed The Reporter a long feature movie. 2006 produced and directed Television show Mi Viejo San Antonio 2007 produced and directed Television show Soluciones Azteca America Channel 31. 2008 produced and Directed SECUESTRADA a long feature movie with the main actors: Irma Dorantes, Eric Del Castillo, Danny De La Paz and Tatiana Smithhart.

Juan Carlos Hernandez is currently the International correspondent for TV Azteca and is the Eagle Eye Productions and Eagle Eye Art Academy Founder and President.

Eagle Eye Productions 
In 2006 Juan Carlos Hernandez in corporation with Tatiana Smithhart started a new production company by the name of Eagle Eye Productions. The production company took off with courage and began producing television programs, documentaries, TV series, and movies. In September 2011, Eagle Eye Art Academy opened its first acting school in San Antonio,Texas. In August 2017, Eagle Eye Art Academy opened in Houston, Texas. its second acting school. In July 2018 another school opened in Miami, Florida. being the third school in the country.

Filmography 

His constant work in the field of production gave extensive experience and knowledge in front and behind the camera. Some of his productions include:
 1998 – Production and direction of the television series "Liberación" on Channel 23 in San Antonio, Texas.
 1999 – Produced and directed the TV series "Jubilee Alive" on Channel 23 in San Antonio, Texas.
 2000 – Produced and directed the documentary "El Manual".
 2001 – Production and direction of the television series "El Manual" on Telemundo Channel 60 in San Antonio, Texas.
 2002 – Produced and directed the documentary " Una Nación Bendecida."
 2004 – He was the pioneer of Azteca America to provide local station in San Antonio, Texas, Channel 31.
 2005 – Produced and directed "The Reporter", a feature film.
 2006 – Production and direction of the TV show "Mi Viejo San Antonio".
 2007 – Production and direction of the TV show "Soluciones" at Azteca America, Channel 31.
 2008 – Production and direction on "Secuestrada" a feature film.https://www.bizjournals.com/sanantonio/stories/2009/10/26/story4.html
 2011 – Production and direction on "Patricia" the last film released in November 30, 2012.

References

External links 
 https://web.archive.org/web/20120402085618/http://www.eagleipro.com/
 http://www.eagleeyeaa.com/
 https://eagleeyeartacademy.com
 https://www.bizjournals.com/sanantonio/stories/2009/10/26/story4.html

People from San Antonio
American film directors of Mexican descent
Film producers from Texas
People from Toluca
Living people
Mexican emigrants to the United States
Film directors from Texas
Year of birth missing (living people)